The Folkestone School for Girls (FSG) is an all-girls grammar school with academy status in Folkestone, Kent, England, next to Sandgate Primary School on Coolinge Lane.

The school, in its current form, on its current site and under its current name, started in 1983. Its history goes much further back, however, to 1905 as the Folkestone County School for Girls. There is a Folkestone School Old Girls' Association with further information and some 800 members, including from various of the current school's predecessors, which, along the way have merged.  The previous names were various:

 The Grange (at Shorncliffe Road)
 Folkestone County Technical School for Girls
 Folkestone Technical High School for Girls
 Folkestone County Grammar School for Girls

The boys' grammar school is called the Harvey Grammar School.

Admissions & Destinations
The school intended to use the entrance examination introduced by Dover Grammar School for Boys, but, after an objection by Kent County Council, it was ruled on 8 July 2005 by the Schools Adjudicator that the school should use the county's selection test and Shepway test.  In 2017, around 85% of students either continued onto university or planned to do so after a gap year. The remainder went into directly into employment.

House System
There are six houses named after historically important women: (Marie) Curie, (Amy) Johnson, (Jane) Austen, (Emmeline) Pankhurst, (Ada) Lovelace and (Mary) Seacole. Each house has an assigned colour, green, red, yellow, blue, orange and purple respectively. The houses also have their own prefects, chosen from Year 13.

Notable former pupils

 Tracey Crouch, Member of Parliament (MP) for Chatham and Aylesford
 Daphne Fowler, Brain of Britain winner 1997, BBC's Eggheads (TV series) team member 2003–Present
 Anne Farmer, professor of psychiatry
 Alison Hastings, Vice-President of the British Board of Film Classification (BBFC), and Editor of Newcastle's Evening Chronicle from 1996-2002 
 Dame Sheila Sherlock, hepatologist

References

External links
 Folkestone School for Girls

Grammar schools in Kent
Girls' schools in Kent
Educational institutions established in 1905
Folkestone
1905 establishments in England
Academies in Kent